William Hodson  may refer to:
 William Stephen Raikes Hodson (1821–1858), British leader of irregular light cavalry during the Indian Rebellion of 1857
 William Hodson (cricketer, born 1808)
 William Hodson (cricketer, born 1841)
 Bill Hodson (1891–1971), Australian politician